The 2014–15 Coupe de France was the 98th season of the most prestigious football cup competition of France. The competition was organised by the French Football Federation (FFF) and was opened to all clubs in French football, as well as clubs from the overseas departments and territories (Guadeloupe, French Guiana, Martinique, Mayotte, New Caledonia, French Polynesia, and Réunion).

Guingamp were the defending champions, having defeated Rennes in the previous season's final, but were knocked out in the semi-finals by Auxerre.

Teams

RC Strasbourg
SR Colmar
Illkirch Graffenstaden
US Sarre-Union
FC St. Etienne Seltz
FC Saverne
FC Saint-Louis Neuweg
SC Dinsheim
FC Mulhouse
AS Girancourt Dommartin Chaumou
FC Libourne
Genêts Anglet
Trélissac FC
US Lormont
Stade Bordelais
FC des Graves
Vendée Luçon
Vendée Poiré-sur-Vie
USJA Carquefou
SO Cholet
USSA Vertou
Voltigeurs de Châteaubriant
JSC Bellevue Nantes
Vendée Fontenay Foot
AS Yzeure
Aurillac FCA
Le Puy Foot 43 Auvergne
RC Vichy
AS Moulins
US Avranches
FC Saint-Lô Manche
AST Deauville
SC Herouvillais
Montceau Bourgogne
FC Chalon
CO Avallonnais
CS Louhans-Cuiseaux
AS Graces
JD Argentré-du-Plessis
AS Vitré
US Concarneau
US Saint-Malo
Stade Plabennecois
Stade Pontivyen
AS Plobannalec-Lesconil
AG Plouvorn
Dinan-Léhon FC
GSI Pontivy
AS Ginglin-Cesson
FC Guichen
AGL Drapeau Fougères
Eglantine Vierzon
Blois Foot 41
Vierzon Foot 18
USM Saran
FC Chauray
US Chauvigny
FC Bressuire
CA Meymacois
ES La Rochelle
ESA Brive
CS Sedan Ardennes
CO Saint-Dizier
Sainte-Savine Rivière de Corps
EF Reims Sainte-Anne Chatillons
Borgo FC
SC Bocognano Gravona
CA Pontarlier
Jura Sud Lavans
SC Clémenceau Besançon
ES Paulhan-Pézenas
RCO Agde
Olympique Alès
AF Lozère
FC Petit-Bard Montpellier
Sarreguemines FC
SAS Épinal
AS Morhange
FC Saint Mihiel
AS Pagny-sur-Moselle
ES Villerupt Thil
US Forbach
Le Mans FC
US St-Berthevin
ES Bonchamp
FC Martigues
GS Consolat
FC Istres
US Marseille Endoume
Étoile Fréjus Saint-Raphaël
Marssac Rivières Senouillac Rives du Tarn
Séméac Olympique
Balma SC
Auch Football
Tarbes Pyrénées Football
Toulouse Rodéo FC
US Maubeuge
AC Cambrai
Iris Club de Croix
FC Loon-Plage
FC Lille Sud
Arras FA
US Boulogne
Stade Béthunois FC
AS Marck
US Nœux-les-Mines
USL Dunkerque
Calais RUFC
US Saint-Omer
CMS Oissel
US Quevilly
ESM Gonfreville
US Lillebonne
Paris FC
FCM Aubervilliers
US Lusitanos Saint-Maur
US Fleury-Mérogis
Sainte-Geneviève Sports
CS Meaux
Olympique Noisy-le-Sec
Red Star F.C.
AS Saint-Ouen-l'Aumône
Champigny F.C. 94
AF Bobigny
FC Chambly
AS Beauvais Oise
Amiens SC
AC Amiens
Ailly sur Somme FC
US Laon
RC Clermont
Aix FC
FC Vaulx en Velin
FC Limonest Saint-Didier
FC Bourgoin jallieu
AS Saint-Priest
Ain Sud Foot
MOS-3 Rivières FC
AS Lyon-Duchère
Olympique Saint-Marcellin
ASF Andrézieux
FC Échirolles
Grenoble Foot 38
Monts d'Or Azergues Foot
FC Rhône Vallées
Siroco Les Abymes (Guadeloupe)
CS Moulien (Guadeloupe)
US Matoury (French Guiana)
US Macouria (French Guiana)
AS Excelsior (Réunion)
SS Saint-Louisienne (Réunion)
A.S. Tefana (French Polynesia)
Les Jumeaux M'Zouasia AS (Mayotte)
Club Franciscain (Martinique)
Les Aiglons Lamentin (Martinique)
AS Magenta (New Caledonia)

Seventh round
There are 88 matches this round. 145 winners from the sixth round are joined by 11 overseas teams and 20 Ligue 2 teams.

!colspan="3" align="center"|15/16 November

|}

|-
!colspan="3" align="center"|15/16 November

|}

Eighth round
There are 44 matches this round.

Round of 64
44 winners of the eighth round are joined by the 20 Ligue 1 teams.

Round of 32

Round of 16

Quarter-finals

Semi-finals

Matches were played on 7–8 April 2015.

Final

The 2015 Coupe de France final was played on 30 May 2015 between Auxerre, from Ligue 2; and Paris Saint-Germain, from Ligue 1.

References

External links

2014–15 European domestic association football cups
2014–15 in French football
2014-15